Antelope is a former hamlet on Strait of Belle Isle, on the Labrador coast. The nearest port of call was Henley Harbour.

See also
List of ghost towns in Newfoundland and Labrador

Populated coastal places in Canada
Populated places in Labrador